General elections were held in Tuvalu on 8 September 1981.

Campaign
A total of 26 candidates contested the 12 seats. As there were no political parties, all candidates ran as independents. Voter turnout was 85.0%.

In Nanumea one candidate, Telavi Faati, called for the island be independent.

Results
Eight of the twelve incumbent MPs retained their seats, with two ministers losing theirs.

Aftermath
Tomasi Puapua was elected Prime Minister with a 7–5 majority over the group a members of parliament headed by former Prime Minister Toaripi Lauti. Puapua appointed a five-member cabinet, keeping the portfolios of foreign affairs and local government for himself. Henry Naisali became Deputy Prime Minister and Minister of Finance, Lale Seluka was appointed Minister for Commerce and Natural Resources, Falaile Pilitati became Minister for Social Services and Solomona Tealofi was appointed Minister for Works and Communications.

References

Tuvalu
Elections in Tuvalu
General election
Non-partisan elections
Election and referendum articles with incomplete results